Christian Weinlig may refer to two German composers:
Christian Ehregott Weinlig (1743–1813)
Christian Theodor Weinlig (1780–1842), nephew of the former